The 2022 Hawthorn Football Club season was the club's 98th season in the Australian Football League and 121st overall, the 23rd season playing home games at the Melbourne Cricket Ground, the 22nd season playing home games at the University of Tasmania Stadium, the 1st season under head coach Sam Mitchell, and the 2nd and final season with Ben McEvoy as captain. This was the first season without Alastair Clarkson as coach since 2004. Hawthorn finished in thirteenth place with a 8–14 improving on their record from the season before. Luke Breust led the club goalkicking for the fourth time finishing the season with 40 goals.

Club summary 
The 2022 AFL season was the 126th season of the VFL/AFL competition since its inception in 1897; having entered the competition in 1925, it was the 98th season contested by the Hawthorn Football Club. Tasmania, iiNet, and Nissan continued as the club's three major sponsors, as they had done since 2006, 2013, and 2019 respectively, while Adidas will continue to manufacture the club's on-and-off field apparel, as they have done since 2013. Hawthorn will continue its alignment with the Box Hill Hawks Football Club in the Victorian Football League, allowing Hawthorn-listed players to play with the Box Hill Hawks when not selected in AFL matches.

Season summary 
26 August 2021 – Adrian Hickmott joins the club as an assistant coach. Hickmott had previously spent 10 years with  serving a number of roles most recently being the midfield coach, alongside Mitchell the pair helped lead West Coast to the 2018 AFL premiership. While Chris Newman re-signed with the club until the end of the 2023 season.

8 September 2021 – Lachlan Bramble signs a two-year deal to remain at the club until the end of the 2023 season.

9 September 2021 – Dylan Moore signs a two-year deal to remain at the club until the end of the 2023 season. Andrew Collins joins as the new head of development coach.

13 September 2021 – David Hale joins the club as an assistant coach. While Brendon Bolton departed the club to join McRae at Collingwood.

16 September 2021 – Hawthorn announces that they've extended their deal to play at University of Tasmania Stadium until the end of 2022.

23 September 2021 – Robert Harvey joins the club as an assistant coach.

7 October 2021 – Daniel Howe signs a one–year deal to remain at the club until the end of 2022. Finn Maginness signs a two–year deal remaining at the club until the end of 2023.

14 October 2021 – Hawthorn signs a three-year deal to extend their partnership with iiNet until the end of 2024.

20 October 2021 – Jackson Callow and Jack Saunders sign one–year deals to remain at Hawthorn until the end of 2022.

7 February 2022 – Denver Grainger-Barras signs a two–year deal to remain at Hawthorn until the end of 2024.

8 February 2022 – Jack Scrimshaw signs a two–year deal to remain at Hawthorn until the end of 2024.

9 February 2022 – Changkuoth Jiath signs a two–year deal to remain at Hawthorn until the end of 2024.

16 February 2022 – Hawthorn signs a five–year deal to extend their partnership with Nissan until the end of 2027.

15 April 2022 – Ned Long signs a one–year extension to stay at Hawthorn until 2023.

17 May 2022 – James Sicily signs a five–year deal to remain at Hawthorn until the end of 2027.

21 June 2022 – Conor Nash signs a two-year deal to remain at Hawthorn until 2024.

24 June 2022 – Mitchell Lewis signs a four–year deal to remain at Hawthorn until the end of 2026.

Playing list changes

Trades

Free agency

Additions

Departures

Draft

AFL draft

Rookie draft

Mid–Season draft

Retirements and delistings

2022 player squad

Community series

Home & Away season

Ladder

Awards, records and milestones

Awards

AFL awards 
 Jai Newcombe – AFLCA young player of the year

Club awards 
 Peter Crimmins Medal – James Sicily
 Lethal award – Jai Newcombe
 Most improved player – Mitchell Lewis
 Most courageous player – Blake Hardwick
 Most promising player – Ned Reeves
 Best clubman – Dylan Moore

Records

Club records 
 Most tackles: Liam Shiels – 1,426
 Most goal assists: Luke Breust – 224
 Most rebound 50's in a season: 179 – James Sicily
 Most rebound 50's in a single game: 15 – James Sicily (Tied with Luke Hodge, and James Sicily)

Milestones
Round 1
 Jack Gunston – 400th AFL goal.
 Mitchell Lewis – 50th AFL goal.
 Finn Maginness – 1st AFL goal.
 Connor MacDonald – AFL debut.
 Josh Ward – AFL debut.
 Max Lynch – Hawthorn debut.
 Sam Mitchell – 1st AFL game as coach, 1st AFL win as coach.

Round 2
 Connor MacDonald – 1st AFL goal.
 Josh Ward – 1st AFL goal.

Round 3
 Jack Scrimshaw – 50th AFL game.
 Chad Wingard – 50th game for Hawthorn.

Round 5
 Luke Breust – 450th AFL goal.
 Jack Gunston – 200th game for Hawthorn.

Round 7
 James Sicily – 100th AFL game.
 Jack Scrimshaw – 50th game for Hawthorn.
 Jackson Callow – AFL debut.

Round 8
 Max Lynch – 1st AFL goal.

Round 9
 Chad Wingard – 200th AFL game, 50th goal for Hawthorn.
 Sam Butler – AFL debut.

Round 10
 Sam Butler – 1st AFL goal.
 Sam Frost – 1st goal for Hawthorn.

Round 12
 Luke Breust – 250th AFL game.
 Liam Shiels – 250th AFL game.
 Changkuoth Jiath – 1st AFL goal.

Round 13
 Dylan Moore – 50th AFL goal.
 Sam Frost – 50th game for Hawthorn.

Round 15
 James Blanck – AFL debut.

Round 17
 Tom Mitchell – 100th game for Hawthorn.

Round 19
 Mitchell Lewis – 50th AFL game.

Round 21
 Jack Gunston – 400th goal for Hawthorn.
 Ben McEvoy – 250th AFL game.
 Dylan Moore – 50th AFL game.
 Jai Serong – AFL debut.

Round 22
 Jarman Impey – 150th AFL game.
 Jai Serong – 1st AFL goal.

Round 23
 Conor Nash – 50th AFL game.
 Ned Long – AFL debut.
 Jack Saunders – AFL debut, 1st AFL goal.

References 

Hawthorn Football Club Season, 2022
Hawthorn Football Club seasons